Christopher B. Shank (born June 30, 1972) is an American politician who has served in a variety of roles within Maryland state government, including Deputy Chief of Staff and Chief Legislative Officer to Governor Larry Hogan. He has previously served in the Maryland Senate representing the 2nd district in Washington County, including a stint as Senate minority whip.

Education
Shank graduated from South Hagerstown High School in Hagerstown, Maryland, and later attended Johns Hopkins University where he received his B.A. (history) in 1994. He graduated a Phi Beta Kappa. He later attained his M.A. (political management) from the Graduate School of Political Management at the George Washington University in 1998. He was the valedictorian and received the Howard Paley Academic Excellence Award.

Career

After college, Shank was a legislative assistant to the Washington County Delegation. He served in this role from 1994 to 1998. Along with being a delegate he is also an adjunct professor at the Graduate School of Political Management at George Washington University.

He is also a member of the Advisory Committee of the Cold Weather Homeless Shelter of Washington County, serving since 1997. He was formerly on the board of directors for the Washington County Chapter of the American Cancer Society. Shank is a member of the American Legislative Exchange Council (ALEC), serving as Maryland state leader.

In 2008, Shank was given a teaching post in George Washington University's Summer Scholars Program. Shank taught a course on election politics. During the 10-day program he lectured on his experience in campaigning as well as worked with students to simulate a mock campaign.

In January 2010, Shank announced his intention to challenge long-serving state senator Donald Munson based on charges that Munson was "too liberal." On September 14, 2010, Shank defeated Munson in the Republican primary election, winning the party's nomination. Shank received 57.05% of the vote compared to Munson's 42.05%.

On January 13, 2015, Shank was appointed as director of the Governor's Office of Crime Control and Prevention and resigned his state senate seat eight days later.

In 2016, Shank was promoted to the Deputy Chief of Staff of Maryland.

Legislative notes
 2005 - voted for slots (HB1361)

Election results
2006 race for Maryland House of Delegates – District 2B
Voters to choose one:
{| class="wikitable"
|-
!Name
!Votes
!Percent
!Outcome
|-
|-
|Christopher B. Shank, Rep.
|9,606
|  99%
|   Won
|-
|-
|Other Write-Ins
|101
|  1.0%
|   Lost
|}

2002 race for Maryland House of Delegates – District 2B
Voters to choose one:
{| class="wikitable"
|-
!Name
!Votes
!Percent
!Outcome
|-
|-
|Christopher B. Shank, Rep.
|7,749
|  72.33%
|   Won
|-
|-
|David M. Russo
|2,954
|  27.57%
|   Lost
|-
|-
|Other Write-Ins
|11
|  0.10%
|   Lost
|}

1998 race for Maryland House of Delegates – District 2B
Voters to choose one:
{| class="wikitable"
|-
!Name
!Votes
!Percent
!Outcome
|-
|-
|Christopher B. Shank, Rep.
|4,873
|  51%
|   Won
|-
|-
|D. Bruce Poole
|4,626
|  49%
|   Lost
|-
|}

References

External links
 Official biography

1972 births
Republican Party Maryland state senators
Republican Party members of the Maryland House of Delegates
Politicians from Hagerstown, Maryland
People from Washington County, Maryland
Johns Hopkins University alumni
Living people
The Graduate School of Political Management alumni
21st-century American politicians